Nowhere Men is a comic book series written by Eric Stephenson. The first six issues were drawn by Nate Bellegarde, colored by Jordie Bellaire, lettered by Fonografix (Steven Finch), and published by Image Comics. 
As of issue 7, Dave Taylor has replaced Nate Bellegarde, who no longer is part of the creative team. Emi Lenox also joined up, providing short comics about Monica Strange, one of the characters of Nowhere Men.

The series centers on a fictional world where a group of four scientists, long since gone their own ways, have had huge cultural influences in a way similar to that of The Beatles in our world. It's loosely based on the story of the British Invasion, especially how The Beatles stood out. The promotional tagline, "Science is the new Rock-N-Roll", exemplifies this.

The name is derived primarily from the fact that things just seem to come out of nowhere for the scientists, although there are other plot points that the name is based on as well. It was also influenced by the Beatles song "Nowhere Man".

Nowhere Men was nominated for four Eisner Awards in 2014, of which it won one: Jordie Bellaire won the award for Best Colorist for her work on several titles, including Nowhere Men.

As of May 2021, eleven issues have been published, the first six of which form the completed first arc. The seventh through eleventh issues are part of the second arc, which started in January 2016 after a two-year delay.

Publication history

Arc 1 
The first arc of Nowhere Men consists of six issues, published between November 2012 and October 2013 and collected in November 2013 in a collected edition with the title Nowhere Men, Vol. 1: Fates Worse Than Death TP.

Arc 2 
The second arc was originally scheduled to start with the release of issue 7 in January 2014, but this  release did not happen. Around the same time, Image Comics pulled the webpages on issues 7, 8 and 9, which resulted in speculation on the series' possible cancellation.

In May 2014, a tweet by Image Comics confirmed the series was still being worked on. Nate Bellegarde attributed the delays in Nowhere Men to himself in a long Google document he posted on his Tumblr in July 2014. While it did not give a predicted date of publishing, it confirmed that the series was still being worked on.

On November 2, 2015, Image Comics announced the return of Nowhere Men. David Taylor replaced Nate Bellegarde. Jordie Bellaire and Fonografiks continued working on the series alongside Stephenson. Emi Lenox provides small comics about the Nowhere Men character Monica Strange.

Issue 7 was released on January 20, 2016, starting the second story arc which hasn't completed as of May 2021.

Cast
Dade Ellis, a neuroscientist and co-founder of World Corp.
Simon Grimshaw, a geneticist and co-founder of World Corp.
Emerson Strange, an inventor, designer and co-founder of World Corp.
Thomas Walker, a theoretical physicist and co-founder of World Corp.
Daniel Pierce, a quantum physicist, astronomer and engineer, employed by the World Corp. Test Division and assigned to the ISS
Adra Madan, a chemist, nutritionist, botanist and biologist, employed by the World Corp. Test Division and assigned to the ISS
Kurt McManus, a medical doctor and biologist, employed by the World Corp. Test Division and assigned to the ISS
Jackson Peake, the ISS systems officer and an EVA, employed by the World Corp. Test Division
Susan Queen, a medical doctor and immunologist, employed by the World Corp. Test Division and assigned to the ISS
Karen Reynolds, a chemist and biologist, employed by the World Corp. Test Division and assigned to the ISS
Holly Jameson, a nuclear physicist, astronomer and engineer, employed by the World Corp. Test Division and assigned to the ISS
Albert Langley, the ISS section chief and an EVA, employed by the World Corp. Test Division
David Burnett, an engineer and roboticist, employed by the World Corp. Test Division and assigned to the ISS
Brian Robeson, an engineer and roboticist, employed by the World Corp. Test Division and assigned to the ISS
Nicholas Hewitt, the ISS communications officer employed by the World Corp. Test Division
Peter Wilson, the ISS life systems officer and an EVA, employed by the World Corp. Test Division
Monica Strange, Emerson Strange's daughter

Story 
Nowhere Men centers on four scientists—Dade Ellis, Emerson Strange, Simon Grimshaw, and Thomas Walker—whose work leads to science becoming as culturally important as rock music. Together, the four form World Corp., a research and development firm that becomes the most influential business in the entire world; but their differences, including a dispute over how to handle a secret experiment gone wrong, drive them apart. According to Stephenson, inspiration was drawn not just from The Beatles, but also from the story of Apple and their war with Microsoft and how he thought the leaders of the two rivals would work if they were teammates.

Sometime after the scientists leave, World Corp. workers aboard the International Space Station begin suffering from a virus that affects each of them differently. Due to the secrecy of the mission, only some higher-ups in World Corp. know that the workers are there; and they're unwilling to bring the workers back to Earth. The crew is left to themselves trying desperately to find a way to get back home.

Awards 
Nowhere Men was nominated for four Eisner Awards in 2014, of which it won one:
Best Continuing Series: Nominee
Best Writer (Eric Stephenson): Nominee
Best Penciller/Inker (Nate Bellegarde): Nominee
Best Coloring (Jordie Bellaire): Winner

External links 
Nowhere Men on WorldCat

Notes and references 

Image Comics limited series
Fictional scientists in comics
2012 comics debuts
Eisner Award winners for Best Coloring